The S15 is a regional railway line of the Zürich S-Bahn on the Zürcher Verkehrsverbund (ZVV), Zürich transportation network, and is one of the network's lines connecting the cantons of Zürich and St. Gallen.

Route 
 

The line runs from Niederweningen (abbreviated as "N'weningen" on the destination sign), in the north-west of the canton of Zürich, to Zurich Oerlikon and Zurich Hauptbahnhof before continuing via Zürich Stadelhofen and Uster to Rapperswil-Jona (Canton of St. Gallen). It serves the following stations:

 
 
 
 
 
 
 
 
 
 
 
 Zürich Hauptbahnhof
 Zürich Stadelhofen
 Uster
 Wetzikon
 Bubikon
 Rüti ZH
 Jona
 Rapperswil

Rolling stock 
Most services were operated once with RABe 514 class (weekdays) and RABe 511 (weekends) trains, before the timetable change in late 2015. Some services are run by Re 450 class locomotives pushing or pulling double-deck passenger carriages.  services are operated with RABe 511 class multiple units or Re 450 class locomotives with double-deck coaches.

Scheduling 
The train frequency on the line is usually 30 minutes and the trip takes 72 minutes. Combined with the S5, the S15 provides quarter-hourly services at stations between Hardbrücke and Rapperswil.

History

The service was started between Rapperswil and Birmensdorf on 10 December 2006, following line improvements. On 9 December 2007, the line was extended from Birmensdorf to Affoltern am Albis. RABe 514 ("DTZ") EMUs were mostly used.

With the introduction of the new timetable in late 2015, the western terminus of the service was switched from Affoltern am Albis to Niederweningen. The stations between Zürich Altstetten and Affoltern am Albis that are no longer served by the S15 are now served by the S14. The S55 between Oberglatt and Niederwenigen was subsumed into the S15.

See also 

 Rail transport in Switzerland
 Trams in Zürich

References

External links 

 ZVV official website: Routes & zones

Zürich S-Bahn lines
Transport in the canton of St. Gallen
Transport in the canton of Zürich
Railway lines opened in 2006